John Lynn was an English marine painter, active from 1826 to 1869. He painted small size shipping and coastal scenes. He exhibited at the British Institution from 1828 to 1838 and at the Suffolk Street Gallery.

References

 
 Bonhams

19th-century English painters
English male painters
19th-century English male artists